Sir John Garrard, 3rd Baronet (1638–1701), was an English politician.

Garrard was the eldest son of Sir John Garrard, 2nd Baronet, of the Garrard baronets and Jane Lambard, daughter of Sir Moulton Lambard, and educated at Christ Church, Oxford (1657) and the Inner Temple (1658). He succeeded his father in the baronetcy and to Lamer Park, Wheathampstead in Herefordshire in 1686.

He was elected a Member of Parliament for Ludgershall in October 1679 and for Amersham in 1698 and for 7 January to 13 January 1701.

He was High Sheriff of Hertfordshire for 1690–91.

He died in 1701 and was laid to rest at St Helen's Church, Wheathampstead. He had married in 1669 Katherine, the daughter and coheiress of Sir James Enyon, 1st Baronet, of Floore, Northamptonshire and the widow of Sir George Buswell, 1st Bt., of Clipston, Northants. They had one daughter Jane, who married Montagu Drake of  Shardeloes, but no son, and he was thus succeeded by his younger brother Sir Samuel Garrard, 4th Baronet.

References

1638 births
1701 deaths
Alumni of Christ Church, Oxford
Members of the Inner Temple
Baronets in the Baronetage of England
English MPs 1698–1700
English MPs 1701–1702
High Sheriffs of Hertfordshire